Beth Meir Synagogue of Bastia is a Jewish Synagogue located at 3 Rue du Castagno in Bastia, on the island of Corsica.

History 
During World War I, Jewish families from French Mandated Syria and Lebanon arrived in Corsica, escaping the ravages of the Sinai and Palestine campaign led by the armies of the German and Ottoman Empire. They settled in the large coastal villages, Bastia and Ajaccio.

The synagogue in Bastia was founded in 1934 in an apartment in the historic section of the city. Its name, Beth Knesset Beth Meir, (in Hebrew :  בית כנסת בית מאיר) is a reference to Rabbi Meïr, one of the  biblical sages quoted in the Mishnah. During the Second World War, when 80,000 Italian soldiers and 15,000 Nazi German soldiers occupied the island, part of the community was imprisoned at a camp in Asco. None of them were deported to nazi concentration camps in Continental Europe, and were released from the prison camp after the liberation of Corsica by the moroccan Goumiers and French Resistance guerilla forces. Rabbi Méir Tolédano (1889-1970) was the community's rabbi from 1920 until his death in 1970.

References

External links 

Arab-Jewish culture in France
Bastia
Lebanese diaspora in France
Lebanese-Jewish diaspora
Mizrahi Jewish culture
Religious buildings and structures in Corsica
Sephardi Jewish culture in France
Synagogues in France
Syrian diaspora in Europe
Syrian-Jewish diaspora